Blastobasis bilineatella is a moth in the family Blastobasidae. It was described by Daniel Lucas in 1956. It is found in Morocco.

References

Blastobasis
Moths described in 1956